Lieutenant Anita Van Buren is a fictional character on NBC's long-running police procedural and legal drama television series Law & Order, portrayed by S. Epatha Merkerson. Van Buren appeared in 390 episodes of Law & Order.  By episode count, she is the longest-running character on the original show. Van Buren appeared in 392 episodes within the franchise (390 of Law & Order, the Law & Order: Criminal Intent episode "Badge" and the Law & Order: Trial by Jury episode "Skeleton") and Exiled: A Law & Order Movie, and is the fourth longest-running regular character in the Law & Order franchise, behind Olivia Benson (Mariska Hargitay), Fin Tutuola (Ice-T), and Donald Cragen (Dann Florek), and the fifth longest-running character in the Law & Order universe, behind Benson (478 episodes in Law & Order: Special Victims Unit), Tutuola (456 episodes in SVU), Cragen (400 episodes in the franchise), and John Munch (Richard Belzer) (452 episodes in the universe, including 122 in Homicide: Life on the Street).

Character history
Van Buren joins the cast in the 1993 episode "Sweeps", succeeding Capt. Don Cragen (Dann Florek) as commander of the 27th Precinct Detective Squad after Cragen transfers to the Anti-Corruption Task Force. Throughout her run on the show, she oversees the work of detectives such as Lennie Briscoe (Jerry Orbach), Mike Logan (Chris Noth), Tony Profaci (John Fiero), Rey Curtis (Benjamin Bratt), Sammy Kurtz (Paul Guilfoyle), Morris LaMotte (Larry Clarke), Joe Cormack (Joe Forbrich), Ed Green (Jesse L. Martin), Joe Fontana (Dennis Farina), Nick Falco (Michael Imperioli), Nina Cassady (Milena Govich), Cyrus Lupo (Jeremy Sisto), and Kevin Bernard (Anthony Anderson).

For almost the entire duration of the series, Van Buren carries a Smith & Wesson Model 36 revolver as her duty weapon. In the 20th season episode "Fed" she is seen carrying a Glock 19.

Van Buren is known for her toughness, but she often pays a price for it. In one episode she shoots and wounds a would-be mugger (Omar Scroggins) who attacks her at an ATM, and kills the mugger's partner, who turned out to be a mentally handicapped teenager. She is investigated, and absolved, by the Internal Affairs Bureau. In another, she nearly loses her job when she sues the NYPD for promoting a white woman with less seniority ahead of her. Her lawsuit becomes such an issue of contention within the department that the Chief of Detectives tells her she will have to resign to get her squad the resources it needs to apprehend a child rapist. A judge eventually dismisses her discrimination suit.

During a murder case, Van Buren learns that the case that led to her promotion to lieutenant was tainted by a dishonest fingerprint examiner's report. The expert, a friend of Van Buren's, had been falsifying various other reports and is tried for her actions, saying that she was just doing what Van Buren wanted. No action is taken against Van Buren, but the scandal continues to haunt her.

In season 17, she is forced to accept Nina Cassady as the replacement for Det. Joe Fontana upon his retirement. Van Buren believes that Cassady is too inexperienced to be a homicide detective, creating a risk to her partner, Ed Green. Van Buren had a "hand-picked" replacement for Fontana who was much more experienced than Cassady. She eventually learns to tolerate (and perhaps accept) Cassady as a member of her squad. However, this acceptance does not seem to last long; in the seventeenth season finale "The Family Hour", Van Buren berates the detective for her inability to keep her temper in check and suggests that Cassady has no future in the 27th Squad.

Personal life
Van Buren was born at some point after 1952. A graduate of John Jay College, Van Buren was married to Donald (Charles Dumas), who owns a hardware store. They divorce after he cheats on her. They have two sons, Stefan, who is the elder, and Ric, who was diagnosed with scoliosis at the age of six. It is revealed that she spent five years as a patrol officer and three years in undercover narcotics. Further revelations are that she enjoys the poet Langston Hughes, and that she is left-handed. She had a sister who was greatly upset by the fact that she could not have children.  She is opposed to the Iraq War and disapproves of hunting.

Her father was wounded in Wasu, Korea during the Korean War in 1952. He spent time at Tulsa VA Hospital in Oklahoma and his wife later claimed that he would have died if it had not been for the excellent care that he received from the medical staff. He had died by 2007. Her detectives have affectionately addressed her by two shortened versions of her rank: "L.T." (used by Rey Curtis, Cyrus Lupo, and Kevin Bernard) and "Lieu" (used by Lennie Briscoe and Ed Green).

Cancer storyline
In Season 20, Van Buren sees an OB/GYN and is diagnosed with Stage II cervical cancer, caused by the sexually-transmitted human papillomavirus (HPV)—which she contracted from Donald, who had been cheating on her. She had not been married to him for at least 5 years. Just before her diagnosis, she began dating a man named Frank (Ernie Hudson). Due to the chemotherapy, she loses her hair and begins wearing a wig. She is so dedicated to her job that she refuses to use medical marijuana because, at the time, it is illegal; however, she starts using it after the Chief of Detectives, a testicular cancer survivor, says he will look the other way if she keeps it discreet. As the season goes on, her treatment is apparently not progressing well and she is becoming increasingly worried about her chances of survival.  However, in the final episode of the season (and ultimately the series), "Rubber Room", her health appears to have improved: she receives a call from her doctor, looks back at her colleagues and whispers "Thank you...Thank you" to herself. The series ends with a fundraising party that her colleagues organized in order to help her pay for the expensive treatment. On the same occasion it is revealed that she and Frank are engaged.

Work history

Awards and decorations
The following are the medals and service awards worn by Lieutenant Van Buren, as seen in "Gunplay" (season 15, episode 5).

Credits

References

Law & Order characters
Fictional African-American people
Fictional characters with cancer
Fictional New York City Police Department lieutenants
Television characters introduced in 1993
Crossover characters in television
American female characters in television
ja:アニタ・ヴァン・ビューレン
pt:Anita Van Buren